Technicolor Special was a common term used for Hollywood studio produced color short films of the 1930s and 1940s that did not belong to a specified series (as marketed in the trade periodicals).

With the Warner Brothers studio, the key word "special" was applied to those color live-action shorts that ran two reels or roughly 20 minutes in length. Those running longer were dubbed Warner Featurettes. Other series names used occasionally were "Technicolor Broadway Brevities" (briefly in the '30s) and "Technicolor Miniatures" (for a pair of ballet performances filmed in 1941).

Overview

Warner Brothers distinguished their two-reel Technicolor Specials from their many shorter color films, running under ten minutes (or one reel) in length. These included the animated Merrie Melodies and later Looney Tunes, Vitaphone Varieties (in color from 1929–30), E. M. Newman "Colortours", Vitaphone Color Parade, Sports Parade, Technicolor Adventures and Scope Gems, the last series occasionally running longer but distinguished by its use of CinemaScope.

Combined, the studio was able to supply theater owners with enough color short subjects practically on a weekly or bi-weekly basis by the end of the thirties. In fact, only one or two feature films needed to be shot annually in color during the years 1940–47 since there was more than enough presented as "extras" before the main feature attraction.
At a time when the studio stopped making features in color, four back-to-back two-reel musicals (over 70 minutes' worth) were made in Burbank, California in the autumn of 1933, with Eddie Cline supervising almost as if he was making a feature film.

1934's Service with a Smile was the first shot in the full Technicolor. Previously a more primitive 2-strip system was used. Two decades later, these were processed under the studio's own Warnercolor system and occasionally dubbed "Warnercolor Specials".

The studio was particularly successful with some recreations of American history during the years 1936–1940, the first being Song of a Nation with Donald Woods playing Francis Scott Key. These kept the costume and set design departments busy and provided major stars like Claude Rains alternative projects to exercise, develop or diversify their acting skills between features. Another sub-series dramatized young men and women (again played by actors on the studio payroll) involved in the different military branches. Such titles as Service with the Colors helped prepare movie-goers for the inevitable conflict overseas and encouraged enlistment. Both series provided enough stock footage for later history lessons like March on America! (stretching from the pilgrim landing on Plymouth Rock through the Japanese attack on Pearl Harbor) and My Country 'Tis of Thee (reusing much of the same footage, but continuing through the war years thanks to recent additions like Beachhead to Berlin).

Likewise, the ambitious mini-musicals of the thirties allowed similar recycling for a trio of forties titles: Musical Movieland, Movieland Magic and Hollywood Wonderland. These only required a "framing scene" with a tour guide showing Hollywood visitors films in production. The production numbers shown were lifted from earlier shorts like Swingtime in the Movies.

By 1942, an increasing number of these were documentary and travelogue subjects. Among the most notable from the post-war crop were a pair of prestigious India travelogues, Soap Box Derby (the first of many trips to the mini-car races in Ohio), Down the Nile (showcasing Egypt post-war), Jungle Terror (covering Hassoldt Davis and his wife's Amazon adventure), The Seeing Eye (covering the Morristown, New Jersey training of dogs for the handicapped), Winter Paradise (John Jay's ski adventure down the Austrian slopes), Thar She Blows! (aboard a whaling ship) and some well-liked scenic tours of Europe filmed by André de la Varre. Edgar Bergen appeared in a comic-travelogue Charlie McCarthy and Mortimer Snerd in Sweden; its director Larry Lansburgh supplied a number of outdoor and animal interest documentary shorts for both Warner Bros. and Walt Disney in the fifties including some Oscar winners.

The later documentaries also benefited greatly from energetic narration (i.e. Marvin Miller also voiced popular radio shows and animated cartoons of the period) and orchestra scores that only a major film studio could provide. Not surprisingly, they continued to do well annually at awards time, with Warner Brothers eventually surpassing Metro-Goldwyn-Mayer in the number of short subject Academy Awards and nominations. Making the Motion Picture Herald lists of top ten money making shorts in 1944-45, the best titles enjoyed a second life as reissues in theaters along with Warner's newer features and shorts, from the mid-'40s through 1967.

List of titles

A full list is provided below, arranged by the year of release (but not necessarily the year filmed). Sometimes a date reviewed by The Film Daily or a copyright date is listed. All run 16 to 22 minutes unless otherwise noted. Since Howard Jackson handled the majority of music scores after 1934, only the William Lava solo efforts are indicated. Gordon Hollingshead produced many titles from Moroccan Nights through Thar She Blows. Cedric Francis took over a key producer in charge after Hollingshead's passing in 1952.

1932-1934 (2-strip system)

1930s (full color)

1940s

1950s

See also
List of short subjects by Hollywood studio#Warner Brothers

Links
Film Daily links (specific dates listed above in List of Titles)
UCLA Film Archives Search (holds copies of many pre-1948 titles)
Library of Congress search site (holds copies of '50s titles)
DVD Talk review of '30s shorts in review of Vitaphone Cavalcade of Musical Comedy Shorts

References
 1965 International Motion Picture Almanac 1964 Quigley Publishing Company 
 
 (pages 294-296, brief coverage of shorts production and number of color features; page 369, color feature figures)
 
 
 Motion Pictures 1912-1939 Catalog of Copyright Entries 1951 Library of Congress 
 Motion Pictures 1940-1949 Catalog of Copyright Entries 1953 Library of Congress 
 Motion Pictures 1950-1959 Catalog of Copyright Entries 1960 Library of Congress 
BoxOffice back issue scans available (release date information in multiple issue "Shorts Charts")

Notes 

Warner Bros. short films
Documentary film series